The Betita mine is a large mine located in Tébessa Province. Betita represents one of the largest phosphates reserve in Algeria having estimated reserves of 175 million tonnes of ore grading 18% P2O5.

References 

Phosphate mines in Algeria